Seton High School may refer to:

 Elizabeth Seton High School, Bladensburg, Maryland
 Seton Catholic Central High School, Binghamton, New York
 Seton Catholic High School, Chandler, Arizona
 Seton Catholic High School (Richmond, Indiana)
 Seton Catholic High School (Pittston, Pennsylvania)
 Seton High School (Cincinnati, Ohio)
 Seton High School (Manassas, Virginia)
 Seton-La Salle Catholic High School, Pittsburgh
 Seton Hall Preparatory School, West Orange, New Jersey
 St. Elizabeth Ann Seton Catholic School, Summerlin, Nevada
 St. Elizabeth Ann Seton Catholic High School, Vancouver, Washington
 Redeemer-Seton High School, New Orleans, Louisiana
 Seton Keough High School, Baltimore, Maryland, formerly called Seton High School

See also
 Elizabeth Seton Academy (disambiguation)